Reverend Bartholomew Price (181829 December 1898) was an English mathematician, clergyman and educator.

Life
He was born at Coln St Denis, Gloucestershire, in 1818. He was educated at Pembroke College, Oxford, of which college (after taking a first class in mathematics in 1840 and gaining the university mathematical scholarship in 1842) he became fellow in 1844 and tutor and mathematical lecturer in 1845. He at once took a leading position in the mathematical teaching of the university, and published treatises on the Differential calculus (in 1848) and the Infinitesimal calculus (4 vols., 1852–1860), which for long were the recognized textbooks there. This latter work included the differential and integral calculus, the calculus of variations, the theory of attractions, and analytical mechanics.

In 1853, he was appointed Sedleian professor of natural philosophy, resigning it in June 1898. His chief public activity at Oxford was in connection with the Hebdomadal Council, and with the Clarendon Press, of which he was for many years secretary. He was also a curator of the Bodleian Library, an honorary fellow of the Queen's College, a governor of Winchester College and a visitor of Greenwich Observatory. 
In 1891, he was elected Master of Pembroke College, which dignity carried with it a canonry of Gloucester Cathedral.
He also seems to have donated an interesting astronomical clock to Gloucester cathedral.

In 1889 he was one of the shareholders in Silver's factory in Silvertown, East London, an immensely profitable rubber company. That year saw a major strike by Silver's workers for higher pay but after 12 weeks the strikers were forced back to work by hunger. Bartholomew Price was the shareholder who moved the motion of thanks in the Managing Director at the shareholders meeting in February 1890.

He was on the governing body of Abingdon School from c.1887 until his death in December 1898.

He died in December 1898 with the title of Reverend and was buried in Holywell Cemetery, Oxford.

Nowadays, Professor Price is best remembered as one of the teachers of Lewis Carroll.  There is a reference to his nickname of 'the bat' in the Mad Hatter's song "Twinkle, Twinkle, Little Bat", a parody of "Twinkle Twinkle Little Star" in Alice's Adventures in Wonderland.

Writings 
 An essay on the relation of the several parts of a mathematical science to the fundamental idea therein contained (1849)
 A Treatise on Infinitesimal Calculus v. 1: Differential calculus (1857)
 A Treatise on Infinitesimal Calculus v. 2. Integral calculus and calculus of variations
 A Treatise on Infinitesimal Calculus v. 3. Statics attractions, dynamics of material particle
 A Treatise on Infinitesimal Calculus v. 4: The dynamics of material systems (1862)

References

1818 births
1898 deaths
People from Cotswold District
19th-century English mathematicians
Fellows of the Royal Society
Alumni of Pembroke College, Oxford
Fellows of Pembroke College, Oxford
Masters of Pembroke College, Oxford
Sedleian Professors of Natural Philosophy
Lewis Carroll
Governors of Abingdon School
Burials at Holywell Cemetery